Lürssen (or Lürssen Werft) is a German shipyard with headquarters in Bremen-Vegesack and shipbuilding facilities in Lemwerder, Berne and Bremen-Fähr-Lobbendorf.

Lürssen designs and constructs yachts, naval ships and special vessels. Trading as Lürssen Yachts, it is one of the leading builders of custom superyachts such as Paul Allen's Octopus, David Geffen's Rising Sun, and Khalifa bin Zayed Al Nahyan's Azzam, the second largest private yacht in the world at 180 m in length after the REV Ocean.

 History 
On 27 June 1875 the 24 year-old Friedrich Lürssen set up a boatbuilding workshop in Aumund, a suburb of Bremen, Germany. The focus of work in the first years was on work boats for fishing and ferry operations. Hull number one was a five meter long rowboat. From the 1880s Lürssen opened up the sport boat market. In 1886 the first motorboat in the world was built by Lürssen (according to his own account). 

In 2016 Lürssen acquired shipbuilding company Blohm+Voss in a long-term partnership.

On 1 March 2018, a German consortium consisting of Thyssen Krupp and Luerssen was excluded by the German Government from the tender for the construction of the multi-purpose warship MKS 180 for the benefit of GNY (German Naval Yards), belonging to the Prinvinvest group, and the Dutch shipbuilder Damen.

On 14 September 2018, a fire broke out in the floating dock at Fähr-Lobbendorf, burning the then-under construction structure of the yacht Sassi. With around 900 emergency services deployed, it was the largest deployment of the Bremen fire brigade in the post-war period. The damage was estimated at more than 610 million euros.

On 29 September 2021, it was announced by Peter Lürssen, owner of company, Blohm+Voss to be downsizing, from the ~ 580 workers, more than 100 would leave the company, the Docks are to be reviewed, no more Cruise ships would be renewed in Hamburg, nor Tankers and Container ships. B+V stays only with the NVL Defence Ships and the Yachts Business. The Area of Installations is to be reduced as well. The Department of Projects of New Buildings was dissolved.

 Yachts 
Below is a list of all the yachts built by Lürssen:

Naval ships
Naval ships built by Lürssen include:
 Many E-boats of World War II, based on Lürssen's design for Otto Hermann Kahn's private yacht Oheka II World War II R boat minesweepers, including the first minesweeper (1929) fitted with a Voith Schneider propeller (R8)
 
 
 
 
 
 
 

Lürssen is currently also involved with the building of s and is part of the ARGE F125 joint-venture designing the s.

Lürssen has the contract to design and build twelve Arafura-class offshore patrol vessels for Australia. Construction of the first two will be in Adelaide by ASC Pty Ltd. The remaining ten will be constructed in Western Australia by Civmec.

Gallery
Yachts

Warships

Trivia
 Lursen-S was the name of a Soviet counter-espionage operation of the late 1940s/early 1950s that infiltrated and compromised Operation Jungle'', an MI6 program that used Lürssen E-boats to insert British-trained Baltic agents into the Soviet Union.
 Lürssen has an app offering a gallery of pictures for most of their luxury yachts along with the length measurements.

See also
 E-boat

References

External links
Lürssen Defence
List of Naval vessels as built by Lürssen GmbH
Yachts built by Lürssen  - SYT
Some Lürssen's yachts videos
Yacht Vive la Vie
 Lürssen honored with the ‘Motor Yacht of the Year Award’ at the World Superyacht Awards 2010 in London for The 60m motor yacht Arkley 

 
Companies established in 1875
Military vehicle manufacturers
German boat builders
Shipbuilding companies of Germany
Defence companies of Germany
German brands
Companies based in Bremen
Manufacturing companies based in Bremen (state)
History of Bremen (city)
1875 establishments in Germany